Bayview Secondary College is a government comprehensive secondary school located in , a suburb of Hobart, Tasmania, Australia. Established in 1980, the school caters for approximately 300 students from Years 7 to 12. The school is administered by the Tasmanian Department of Education.

In 2019 student enrolments were 293. The college principal is Gill Berriman.

Description 

See also 
 List of schools in Tasmania
 Education in Tasmania

References

External links 
 Bayview Secondary College website

Public high schools in Hobart
Educational institutions established in 1980
1980 establishments in Australia